is a railway station in Kita-ku, Hamamatsu,  Shizuoka Prefecture, Japan, operated by the third sector Tenryū Hamanako Railroad.

Lines
Okuhamanako Station is served by the Tenryū Hamanako Line, and is located 56.8 kilometers from the starting point of the line at Kakegawa Station.

Station layout
The station has a single side platform. The station is unattended.

Adjacent stations

|-
!colspan=5|Tenryū Hamanako Railroad

Station history
Okuhamanako Station was established on March 13, 1988 as part of the expansion of services on the Tenryū Hamanako Line after the privatization of JNR in 1987.

Passenger statistics
In fiscal 2016, the station was used by an average of 26 passengers daily (boarding passengers only).

Surrounding area
Lake Hamana
Japan National Route 362

See also
 List of Railway Stations in Japan

External links

  Tenryū Hamanako Railroad Station information 
 

Railway stations in Shizuoka Prefecture
Railway stations in Japan opened in 1988
Stations of Tenryū Hamanako Railroad
Railway stations in Hamamatsu